Rhopalodontidae is a family of dinocephalian therapsids.

References

Dinocephalians
Prehistoric therapsid families
Permian first appearances
Permian extinctions